"The Bonny Hind" is Child ballad number 50 (Roud 205).

Synopsis
A squire persuades a maiden to lie with him.  Afterward, she asks his name, and he reveals that he is a lord's son.  She calls him a liar:  she is that lord's daughter.  The horror-struck son reveals that he was long at sea.  She stabs herself to death, and he buries her.  He goes home and grieves for a "bonny hind" whatever his father can do to distract him.

Variants
Other ballads on this theme include "Sheath and Knife", "The King's Dochter Lady Jean", and "Lizie Wan".

See also
The Bonnie Banks o Fordie

References

Child Ballads
Year of song unknown